Yukiwo P. Dengokl (born November 25, 1955) is a member of the Senate of Palau. He grew up in both Palau and the Federated States of Micronesia. He is also a lawyer and attorney at law.

Early life 
Dengokl was born on November 25, 1955, as the child of Mr. Hiroshi Nakamura of Peleliu State, and Didil Dengokl of Airai State. However, he was raised by his maternal grandparents as a child.

Education 
He attended the George B. Harris Elementary School, and then he attended the Xavier High School in Chuuk, Micronesia. Shortly after his graduation from Santa Clara University, he became a teacher at the Pohnpei Agriculture and Trade School in the FSM. He then returned to Santa Clara to achieve a Juris Doctor degree.

Career

Pre-congress 
In 1989, Senator Dengokl was appointed by the late former Governor of Aimeliik State, Simer Eriich, to represent Aimeliik State in the Commission on Future Palau - U.S. Relations. The same year, he was chosen for the Judicial Nominating Commission. From 1993 to 1994, He served for the Palau Community College Board of Trustees.

Admission to congress 
In the 2000 Palauan general election, he became a senator of the Palau National Congress.

Everett Walton incident 
In 2007, Jackson Ngiraingas filed a 28 page complaint against special prosecutor Everett Walton. Dengokl retrieved a copy of the complaint, along with Chief Justice Arthur Ngiraklsong. He asked both Arthur and Yukiwo to investigate Everett Walton.

Personal life 
He is married to Carol O. Emaurois and they have one son, Odanges N. Dengokl.

References

1955 births
Living people
Members of the Senate of Palau
Santa Clara University alumni
Palauan lawyers